Angarocaris is an Aglaspidid-like extinct genus of basal chelicerate. Found during the Ordovician period, Angarocaridid fossils are found primarily in the Siberian Platform.

References

External links 
 Angarocaris at the Paleobiology Database

Prehistoric chelicerates
Fossil taxa described in 1953